Renate Stendhal, Ph.D. (born Renate Neumann, January 29, 1944) is an interpersonal counselor, writing coach, and author of nonfiction, fiction, and self-help books exploring feminist, erotic, and lesbian themes, including three co-written with therapist and author Kim Chernin, her life partner. Many of her books focus on the erotic and creative empowerment of women. Born in Germany, she has lived in northern California since the 1980s.

Biography 
During her school years in Berlin and Hamburg, Renate Stendhal pursued studies of music, singing, painting, and dancing. She majored in literature at Hamburg University, then moved to Paris in 1966 to focus on classical dance. After an engagement at the Deutsche Oper Berlin, she returned to Paris in 1970 and joined an experimental theater group. From 1975 to 1982, she worked in Paris as a cultural correspondent for German radio and press (Frankfurter Rundschau et al.) – an occupation she picked up again in 2005, writing cultural reviews for the international magazine Scene4. In Paris, she also worked for many years as a personal assistant for surrealist painter Meret Oppenheim.

Early life 
With the beginning of the French and German feminist movements, Renate Stendhal became an activist and co-created (with Danish painter Maj Skadegaard) the first feminist multimedia show in Europe, “In the Beginning . . . of the End: A Voyage of Women Becoming” (1980). A year later, the show was recorded on film by Studio D of the National Film Board of Canada and shown at women's festivals and international film festivals. While touring with the film across Europe from 1980 to 1983, Renate Stendhal started giving workshops and lectures on women's creative and erotic empowerment. Her essays and articles appeared in major feminist magazines including Feministische Studien and EMMA.

Feminism Contributions 
During the eighties, she became the first German translator of feminist authors Susan Griffin, Audre Lord, Adrienne Rich, and others. In 1984, she accompanied Audre Lorde as a translator on a reading tour of Germany and Switzerland. She translated Gertrude Stein's only mystery novel, Blood on the Dining-Room Floor, into German keine keiner and in 1989 created a photo-biography with parallel visual and textual readings of Stein's life, Gertrude Stein: In Words and Pictures. The English edition (Algonquin Books, 1994) earned a Lambda Award. In 2009, the photo-biography was republished and served as an inspiration for the exhibition  "Seeing Gertrude Stein: Five Stories, Summer 2011", at the Contemporary Jewish Museum of San Francisco and The National Portrait Gallery in Washington, D.C. Renate Stendhal was involved in the educational programming surrounding the show and the parallel exhibition "The Steins Collect: Matisse, Picasso and the Parisian Avant-Garde", at SFMOMA. Her blog, quotinggertrudestein, followed the preparations, the "Summer of Stein" and the aftermath of the epochal exhibitions.

Later Years 
Since her move to California in 1986, she earned an MA in clinical psychology and a Ph.D. in spiritual psychology, but chose not to pursue a license as a therapist. Instead, she chose a spiritual path, getting ordained as a minister by AIWP, the Association for the Integration of the Whole Person, practicing a different kind of listening and intuitive, common sense conversation. In 2005, she became a provost at the University of Integrative Learning, guiding students through MA and Ph.D. programs that reward students for their lifelong learning. In 2010-2011, she became a certified hCG practitioner in the Dr. Simeons weight-loss protocol based on hCG amino acids.

In the States, Renate Stendhal published Sex and Other Sacred Games (Times Books, 1989), co-authored with her life companion, author Kim Chernin, with whom she also co-authored the portrait of a young opera singer, Cecilia Bartoli: The Passion of Song (HarperCollins, 1997). She wrote and illustrated a novel for young adults, The Grasshopper's Secret: A Magical Tale (EdgeWork Books, 2002), and continued her reflections on women and eros with True Secrets of Lesbian Desire: Keeping Sex Alive in Long-Term Relationships (North Atlantic Books, 2003), originally published as Love's Learning Place: Truth as Aphrodisiac in Women's Long-Term Relationships(EdgeWork Books, 2002). Her most recent collaboration with Kim Chernin is Lesbian Marriage: A Love & Sex Forever Kit (Lesbian Love Forever, 2014) a quick reference guide and handy toolkit for married and soon-to-be married couples. Renate Stendhal has been a writing consultant and editor for over thirty years for professional and beginning writers.

Other Work 
Renate Stendhal's work, articles, and essays have appeared internationally in Lambda Literary Online, The Huffington Post, The Los Angeles Times, The San Francisco Chronicle, Ms. Magazine, The Advocate, Chicago Quarterly Review, Tikkun Magazine, Four Seasons Magazine,  Epochalips, The Daily Beast, Travel Magazine, Centre Pompidou, online , Emma Magazine, and many others.

Memoir 
Her latest publication is the award-winning  Parisian memoir à clef, Kiss Me Again, Paris: A Memoir.

Books 
 Gertrude Stein: Ein Leben in Bildern und Texten (1989) 
 Sex and Other Sacred Games (with Kim Chernin; 1989) 
 Gertrude Stein: In Words and Pictures (1989) 
 Cecilia Bartoli: The Passion of Song (with Kim Chernin; 1997) 
 Cecilia Bartoli: Eine Liebeserklärung (1999) 
 The Grasshopper's Secret: A Magical Tale (2002) 
 True Secrets of Lesbian Desire: Keeping Sex Alive in Long-Term Relationships (2003) 
 Die Farben der Lust - Sex in lesbischen Liebesbeziehungen (2004) 
 Lesbian Marriage: A Love & Sex Forever Kit (with Kim Chernin; 2014) 
 Kiss Me Again, Paris: A Memoir (2017)

Awards and honors 
 Winner of 1995 Lambda Literary Award for Lesbian Biography Gertrude Stein: In Words and Pictures
 Winner of a 2016 WNBA Award, juried by Deirdre Bair, for an excerpt from her unpublished memoir Kiss Me Again, Paris: A Memoir
 Winner of 2018 International Book Awards in LGBTQ Non-Fiction for her memoir Kiss Me Again, Paris: A Memoir
 Nominated for 2018 Lambda Literary Award in Lesbian Non-Fiction/Memoir for Kiss Me Again, Paris: A Memoir
 Finalist for 2018 Best Book Awards in LGBTQ Non-fiction for Kiss Me Again, Paris: A Memoir

External links 
 Renate Stendhal's personal website
 Interview on Blog Talk Radio - Part 1
 Interview on Blog Talk Radio - Part 2
 Renate Stendhal interview on KWMR Radio
 Renate Stendhal appears in the film: Audre Lorde - The Berlin Years 1984 to 1992
 Interview and review in Rain and Thunder: A Radical Feminist Journal of Discussion and Activism Summer 2020 Issue

References 

 The Gertrude Stein Dossier by Charles Bernstein https://jacket2.org/feature/gertrude-steins-war-years-setting-record-straight
 "Renate Stendhal, “Was Gertrude Stein a Collaborator?” in The Los Angeles Review of Books, December 17, 2011; see also Stendhal’s blog and her article “Gertrude Stein, Hitler and Vichy-France: Process Notes” in Trivia: Voices of Feminism (2012)."
 Renate Stendhal, Kiss Me Again, Paris mentioned in The New York Review of Books.
 Referenced in essay on Sex and Other Sacred Games by Lise Weil 
 "When Women Loved Women" by The Argonaut May 31, 2017
 Featured in LGBTQ Stars - GO Magazine, June 1, 2017
 "Good Girl Gone Free in Paris" Women & Words  June 18, 2017
 Appeared in article Gay Weddings Journal, April 3, 2018
 Mentioned in The Bookwoman Vol. 80, Number 3, Spring 2017
 "Renate Stendhal and Kim Chernin are Experts" in Point Reyes Light Magazine
 "Renate Stendhal places recent Gertrude Stein controversy in context" in Poetry Foundation
 Referenced in Harvard Gay & Lesbian Review
 Mentioned in San Francisco Chronicle
 Renate Stendhal reviewed in Autostraddle
 IFSF Publishing reviews Renate Stendhal
 Megan G Reviews Renate Stendhal's Kiss Me Again, Paris - Lesbrary Reviews

1944 births
American non-fiction writers
English–German translators
Feminist writers
American feminists
German feminists
German women writers
Living people
Lambda Literary Award winners
Writers from Berkeley, California
People from Point Reyes, California
American women non-fiction writers
21st-century American women